National Route 359 is a national highway of Japan connecting Toyama, Toyama and Kanazawa, Ishikawa in Japan, with a total length of 56.2 km (34.92 mi).

References

National highways in Japan
Roads in Ishikawa Prefecture
Roads in Toyama Prefecture